Lucky Tapes (ラッキーテープス) are a Japanese male trio band formed by keyboardist and vocalist Kai Takahashi, bassist Keito Taguchi, and drummer Tsubasa Hamada in 2014. The current lineup includes guitarist Kensuke Takahashi after Hamada left in 2016.

History 
In May 2014, the band Slow Beach, which included keyboardist Kai Takahashi, broke up. The following month, Takahashi and two others, Keito Taguchi and Tsubasa Hamada, formed Lucky Tapes in June 2014. The band was backed up by guitarists Masahiko Akemi (from Tokyo Sapiens) and Kensuke Takahashi, who would later join the band. On July 19, they released their debut singles "Peace and Magic" and "Sunday Night" at the same time.

On April 2, 2015, they released the single "Touch!" with a music video. The video included actress Kaho Seto and the video received high praise. On August 5, 2015, they released their debut album, The Show, under Rallye Label. The album was popular so much that their first live show at Shibuya WWW sold out. On January 13, 2016, they released the single "Moon," alongside a music video that starred Shiori Takei. On July 6, 2016, they released their second album Cigarette & Alcohol. In 2017, they released the four-track single "Virtual Gravity," which included the previously unreleased song "Sherry."

On May 23, 2018, they released the EP 22, which included the single of the same name. In April 2018, the band held a tour for their upcoming album dressing. On September 25, 2018, they released the single "Lonely Lonely" featuring singer Chara, with a music video directed by Katsuki Kuroyanagi. On October 3, 2018, they released the album dressing. It was their first album release on a major record label, being JVCKenwood Victor Entertainment. In 2019, they released the single "Actor," which was previewed at Fuji Rock Festival 2019.

On November 25, 2020, the band released the album Blend, their first album in over two years. The album was recorded at their own homes because of the COVID-19 pandemic in Japan. The song "Wonderland" was featured as the theme song for the web series Match Girls.

Members

Current 
Kai Takahashi (高橋海) – lead vocalist, keyboardist
Keito Taguchi (田口恵人) – bass
Kensuke Takahashi (高橋健介) – guitar

Former 
Tsubasa Hamada (濱田翼) – drums (until 2016)

Discography

Studio albums

Extended plays

Singles

References

External links 
Official website
Twitter profile
Instagram profile
YouTube channel

2014 establishments in Japan
J-pop music groups
Japanese indie pop groups
Japanese musical trios
Japanese rock music groups